Xperia is the brand name of smartphones and tablets from Sony. The name Xperia is derived from the word "experience", and was first used in the Xperia X1 tagline of "I Xperia the best".

Sony Mobile was previously known globally as Sony Ericsson before being rebranded in 2012 as a result of the mobile phone manufacturer being taken over and solely owned by Sony.

History

The Xperia X1 was the first phone to be released in the Xperia range. Released in 2008, it featured a high resolution display (~311 ppi pixel density) and it was intended to fill the widening gap of smartphones as other competitors were producing high-end smartphone devices such as HTC and Apple.

The X2 was released in the following year, which included an 8.1 MP camera and included Wifi and GPS. By this time there was a clear shift towards the smartphone end of the spectrum. An exception was the Xperia Pureness, a translucent phone without camera that was sold by selected retailers in selected cities. The Xperia X5 Pureness is based on Sony Ericsson's proprietary operating system (OSE).

The X10 was released at the start of 2010. It was the first in the Xperia line to feature the Android operating system, where previous models ran on the Windows Mobile OS. The phone was praised on its design, but its downfall was its use of Android 1.6 at a time when competitors were on 2.1. There was a great delay in the update of the firmware, due to the heavily skinned OS, as well as Timescape and Mediascape which needed to be reprogrammed every time an update was made. The phone also lacked pinch to zoom, but this was added later as well as HD video recording. 

The X10 Mini and the X10 Mini Pro were, as the names suggest, smaller versions of the X10. These were received relatively well and proved to be very popular, as there were no other smartphones on the market at that time which were as small as the two.

The Z series smartphones continued the Xperia legacy with an omni-balance design and water resistance. On several Sony Xperia smartphones such as the Xperia Z, the charging port is located at the top of the left edge, rather than popularly at the bottom center. 

The Xperia Z is the earliest known device to feature high dynamic range filming, and does it at 1080p. Its image sensor is an Exmor IMX135.

After the Sony Xperia Z (early 2013), the Z1 (late 2013) was released with increased processing performance and a physical shutter button, as well as augmented reality camera effects such as a walking dinosaur.

In early 2014, the Sony Xperia Z2 was introduced with 2160p video recording, 1080p at 60 frames per second, and 720p at 120fps for slow motion, as well as precluded screencasting functionality.

In 2016, Sony introduced the new Xperia X series to replace the Z series and in 2018, Sony introduced the Sony Xperia XZ2 along with the Sony Xperia XZ2 Compact at Mobile World Congress 2018 featuring Sony's brand new "Ambient Flow" smartphone design while the premium smartphone, the Sony Xperia XZ2 Premium featuring a 4K HDR Display and a 19 MP + 12 MP MotionEye Dual camera built for 'extreme' low-light shooting was announced two months later.

Sony has been criticized for the heavily inconsistent naming of their Xperia devices.

Sony Ericsson

Smartphones (Windows Mobile)

Smartphones (Android)

Feature phones

Sony

Smartphones

Tablets

Smartwatch

Projector

Robotic Assistant

See also
Sony Xperia Z series

References

External links
Sony Mobile.com – Sony Mobile official website
Developer World
Xperia Care – Global support

Products introduced in 2008
Sony smartphones
Xperia
 
Xperia